The Prayag–Lucknow Intercity Express is an Express train belonging to Northeast Frontier Railway zone that runs between  (in Allahabad) and  in India. It is currently being operated with 14209/14210  train numbers on a daily basis.

Service

The 14209/Prayag–Lucknow Intercity Express has an average speed of 40 km/hr and covers 1472 km in 37h. The 14210/Lucknow–Prayag Intercity Express has an average speed of 38 km/hr and covers 1472 km in 39h.

Route and halts 

The important halts of the train are:

Coach composition

The train has standard ICF rakes with a max speed of 110 kmph. The train consists of 12 coaches:

 1 Chair Car
 9 General Unreserved
 2 Seating cum Luggage Rake

Traction

Both trains are hauled by WAP-5 or WAP-7 electric locomotive from Prayag Sangam to Lucknow and vice versa since full route is electrified.

See also 

 Prayag Junction railway station
 Lucknow Charbagh railway station
 Triveni Express
 Shaktinagar Terminal–Bareilly Triveni Express

Notes

References

External links 

 14209/Prayag–Lucknow Intercity Express India Rail Info
 14210/Lucknow–Prayag Intercity Express India Rail Info

Trains from Allahabad
Passenger trains originating from Lucknow
Express trains in India